The Union syndicale des magistrats, commonly abbreviated as USM, is the French largest magistrates trade union - in terms of membership (roughly 2000 out of 8000 magistrates) and support in professional elections (68% in the 2013 elections).

The USM claims to be apolitical, contrary to the Syndicat de la Magistrature (the second largest union, that often express strong left-wing views and opposition to conservative policies).

Politics of France
Trade unions in France